Santo Stefano di Magra (Lunigiano ) is a comune (municipality) in the Province of La Spezia in the Italian region Liguria, located about  southeast of Genoa and about  northeast of La Spezia. It is located near the confluence of torrent Vara into the Magra river. It is part of the Montemarcello-Magra Natural Regional Park. It has an entrance and exit to the toll-paying "Autostrada"

The municipality of Santo Stefano di Magra contains the frazioni (subdivisions, mainly villages and hamlets) Ponzano Magra, Ponzano Belaso, and Ponzano Superiore.

Santo Stefano di Magra borders the following municipalities: Aulla, Bolano, Sarzana, Vezzano Ligure.

History

Founded before 1000 AD, Santo Stefano is remembered as a marketplace in 981 by Emperor Otto II and in 1185 by Emperor Frederick I. It was a stage across the Via Francigena, with a hospice housing pilgrims and travellers.

Around 1200 it is first mentioned on a written source, in the event of the peace between the Malaspina family and the bishops of Luni.

Main sights
The town is divided into two parts by the old central road, and enclosed by powerful late Renaissance walls. The church dedicated to St. Stephen was built in the 18th century over a medieval pieve.

Demographic evolution

References

External links

Cities and towns in Liguria